U3 small nucleolar ribonucleoprotein protein IMP4 is a protein that in humans is encoded by the IMP4 gene.

References

Further reading